This is a list of lighthouses in Singapore.

Lighthouses

See also
 Lists of lighthouses and lightvessels
 List of tallest buildings in Singapore

References

External links

 

Singapore

Lighthouses
Lighthouses